Amzad Hossain (died 9 May  2005) is a politician from Dinajpur District of Bangladesh. He was elected a member of parliament from Dinajpur-7 and Dinajpur-3.

Career
Hossain was elected to parliament from Dinajpur-7 as a Awami League candidate in 1973. He was elected to parliament from Dinajpur-3 as a Awami League candidate in 1986.

References

Awami League politicians
3rd Jatiya Sangsad members
1st Jatiya Sangsad members
2005 deaths
Year of birth missing